Seeker & Servant are an American worship band from Jackson, Mississippi, where the trio started making music in 2012. They play CEDM, CCM, and Christian rock styles of music. Their first release, Into Your Love, I Go, a studio album, was released in 2014. They have also released a second studio album, You Alone Forever, in 2015.

Background
The group started in 2012, with brothers Cameron and Chandler Wood getting together with Kody Gautier to form their trio in Jackson, Mississippi.

Music history
Into Your Love, I Go
Seeker & Servant's first studio album, Into Your Love, I Go", was released on January 7, 2014.You Alone ForeverSeeker & Servant released You Alone Forever, on November 13, 2015.  The album got a 4.5 star review from Worship Leader magazine

Members
 Cameron Wood
 Chandler Wood

-Previous Members-
 Kody Gautier (2013-2015)

Discography
Studio albums
 Into Your Love, I Go (January 7, 2014)
 You Alone Forever'' (November 13, 2015)

References

External links
 Official Website
 Facebook
 Instagram
 Twitter
 Youtube

Musical groups from Mississippi
Musical groups established in 2012
2012 establishments in Mississippi